The 2008–2009 Maryland Terrapins men's basketball team represented the University of Maryland in National Collegiate Athletic Association (NCAA) Division I competition as a member of the Atlantic Coast Conference (ACC). The Terrapins qualified for the NCAA tournament for just the second time since the 2003–04 season. Maryland advanced to the second round before being eliminated by second-seeded Memphis. This exceeded expectations for the team, which had been described as a team that was small in stature without any highly touted athletes.

Season recap
During the season, head coach Gary Williams came under fire for his alleged failure to find consistent success since Maryland won the national championship in 2002. At one point, he and an athletics department official argued publicly over the failure to secure recruit Tyree Evans and the transfer of Gus Gilchrist, two highly touted local players. Athletic director Deborah Yow responded to the situation by vowing support for Williams and ensured her intent to honor his current contract. Soon after, The Washington Post published a three-part feature on Maryland basketball that was critical of Gary Williams.

Early in the season, a lightly regarded Maryland team convincingly upset over fifth-ranked (and eventual national championship runners-up) Michigan State, 80–62, in the Old Spice Classic. Shortly thereafter, they defeated Michigan in the ACC-Big Ten Challenge. They then extended their winning streak to seven and appeared destined to win out in their non-conference schedule, which would have weighed heavily in their favor for an NCAA tournament bid. However, in their final out-of-conference game, they suffered an upset against Morgan State, 66–65.

After a 2–2 start to their conference schedule, which included an overtime loss to Florida State, second-ranked Duke routed the Terrapins, 85–44, in what was Maryland's worst-ever ACC loss. Late in the season, Maryland recovered to "stun" third-ranked North Carolina in overtime, and point guard Greivis Vasquez recorded the first triple-double by a Terrapin since 1987. Maryland then lost closely contested games against seventh-ranked Duke and tenth-ranked Wake Forest.

Maryland entered the ACC tournament needing a significant run to salvage hopes for a bid to the NCAA tournament. The Terrapins won in the first round against NC State and advanced to the quarterfinals, where they won a convincing victory over Wake Forest, 75–64. In the semifinals, they lost a hard-fought game against eventual conference champions, Duke, who had enjoyed a bye in the first game.

Having exceeded expectations in the ACC tournament, Maryland was awarded a bid to the NCAA tournament with a seed ranking of ten. In the first round, they played seventh-seeded California, where, after a near stalemate in the first half, Maryland pulled away in the second to win, 84–71. They then faced second-seeded Memphis, which held a 26-game winning streak.

Before the game, Memphis reserve forward Pierre Henderson-Niles said about Maryland, "We really ain't talked too much about Maryland. We watched a little film on 'em one time, and I know they got a good player—I don't know his name—but he good or whatever, so we just going to try to do what we do and stop him. I ain't never seen them; I know they got one good player, Sanchez or something like that, whatever his name is." Greivis Vasquez, the outspoken Maryland point guard to whom Henderson-Niles referred, said in response, "[Memphis would] have a losing record in the [Atlantic Coast Conference]—probably win all of their games outside the league, losing record in the league. The ACC is too tough. You can't just win games night in and night out because you’re so athletic."

Memphis accumulated a 14–0 run in the first half. Maryland, unable to ever significantly close the gap, eventually lost, 89–70. After the game, Vasquez rescinded his earlier remarks and conceded that Memphis might have finished .500 in the ACC. He said, "They'll never play in the ACC, so we'll never know. But they proved me wrong. They're such a good team. I give them credit."

Roster

Results

|-
!colspan=9| Regular season

|-
!colspan=9| ACC Tournament

|-
!colspan=9| NCAA tournament

References 

Maryland Terrapins men's basketball seasons
Maryland
Maryland
2008 in sports in Maryland
2009 in sports in Maryland